Sri Ramakrishna College is a national school in Akkaraipattu, Sri Lanka.

See also
 List of schools in Eastern Province, Sri Lanka

References

National schools in Sri Lanka
Schools in Ampara District